Outa Space is a 1999 single by Mellow Trax. It samples Max Romeo's Chase the Devil.

The song made No. 14 in Austria, No. 42 in Switzerland, No. 27 in France, No. 41 on the UK Singles Chart and No. 43 on the Hot Dance Music/Maxi-Singles Sales chart in the United States.

References

1999 singles
1999 songs